Derek Smyth  (born 24 April 1927) is a British biochemist who specialises in peptide structure and function. In 2002, he was admitted as a Fellow of the Royal Society of Chemistry.

Background
Derek Smyth was Head of the Laboratory of Peptide Chemistry at the National Institute for Medical Research (NIMR) in Mill Hill, London from 1972 to 1992. He had worked previously with Professor Joseph Fruton, Head of the Biochemistry Department at Yale University, where he gained experience in protein and peptide chemistry (1-3) and in 1960 transferred to Rockefeller University in New York City where in the laboratory of Stanford Moore and William Howard Stein (Nobel Prize winners) he reinvestigated and established the definitive amino acid sequence of pancreatic ribonuclease (4-8), the first enzyme (some say the first protein) to have its primary structure determined (9).

On moving to NIMR in 1963, Smyth prepared two novel derivatives of oxytocin, N-carbamylcystine-1-oxytocin and N-carbamyl cystine-1-O-carbamyltyrosine-2-oxytocin, and in a collaborative study with Gordon Bisset it was shown that while the monocarbamyl hormone retained weak biological activity (10), the dicarbamyl derivative proved to be a specific inhibitor of oxytocin devoid of intrinsic activity (11,12), demonstrating that the action of the hormone takes place in consecutive stages that could be studied independently (13).

Maintaining his interest in protein structure (14-16), Smyth and Sayaki Utsumi unravelled the structure at the ‘hinge region’ of rabbit 7S gamma globulin, juxtaposing the FAB and (FAB)2 fragments in the 4-chain IgG molecule, locating the bridge that links the half molecules, and revealing a new oligosaccharide chain adjacent to the disulphide bridge (17-21). Present on one H-chain and not the other, the carbohydrate renders the IgG molecule asymmetric but the biological function of the carbohydrate is not known. It could serve to anchor the antibody molecule at sites where toxic glycoproteins (viruses) act.

He followed this by sequencing the connecting peptide (C-peptide) of proinsulin in a range of species, indicating a conservation of secondary structure (22-25). The contribution made by the C-peptide to a 3-dimensional structure of proinsulin was proposed by Snell and Smyth (25) who constructed a model of the prohormone by aligning the secondary structure of the C-Peptide with the structure of insulin (established in the crystallographic studies of Tom Blundell and his colleagues). In the model, the C-peptide masked the ‘active site’ of the insulin moiety, accounting for the inactivity of the prohormone, and the paired basic residues sites were located externally, accessible to enzymic activation.

The enzymatic processing of prohormones to release their biologically active constituents was a dominant lifetime interest. His major contribution came from studies of β-lipotropin (61), now recognised as a component of the pro-opiomelanocortin locus. In a classic series of papers from 1975 to 1982, he and his team (26-34) showed that the C-terminal fragment of lipotropin, discovered by Smyth in the pituitary (35-37), was an endogenously expressed opiate (38). Feldberg and Smyth demonstrated that this 31 amino acid peptide, now known as β-endorphin, is a neurohormone with potent analgesic activity (39-43) and profoundly significant in brain function (40, 44, 45).

Among the peptides he isolated from pituitary was a 39 residue glycopeptide with a strongly conserved sequence of amino acids (46), subsequently shown to represent the entire C-terminal region of the vasopressin prohormone. Immunohistochemical mapping with antibody to the glycopeptide has made possible complete differentiation to be made between the distribution of vasopressin and oxytocin in the brain.

Subsequently, Bradbury and Smyth elucidated the mechanism of peptide amidation (46-49), a post-translational modification essential for the activity of many peptide hormones and hormone releasing peptides and more recently Smyth and his colleagues isolated and identified a series of tripeptide amides with structure related to thyrotropin-releasing hormone (50-54). These peptides possess inhibitory properties and appear to fulfil a physiological role in hormone regulation. Thus pGlu Phe Pro amide which occurs in testis has been shown to inhibit the release of testosterone (51) while pGlu His Pro amide which is present in thyroid inhibits release of thyroglobulin.

The continuing line of his research culminated in the proposal of a new concept for the regulation of peptide hormone activity (54). In the mechanism involved, although increase in activity is initiated by synthesis of hormone releasing peptide in the hypothalamus, the action of the releasing peptide is counteracted by inhibition at its target site in the periphery. That hormone activity should be sensitive to processes involving both activation and inhibition makes possible 'minute-by-minute' fine control, a key feature not present in the conventional switch on-switch off mechanism.

It may be noted that the dual mechanism proposed for hormone regulation is analogous to the mechanism involved in synaptic transmission in the central nervous system, in line with a common evolutionary origin for the central and peripheral processes.

His wide-ranging studies of structure and function in biologically active peptides indicated that the regulation of their activity involves a dual mechanism. It embodies a fundamental principle, that 'activation' and 'inhibition' act diametrically to determine the levels of hormones in the circulation and transmitters in the CNS. Overall his research demonstrated that at the molecular level, biological activity is 'structure and change of structure'.

After retiring from NIMR, Smyth continued his research at the Institute for Molecular Biology in Salzburg (56, 57), in the Pharmacology Department of the University of Murcia (58-61) and in the William Harvey Research Institute, University of London (62). For a number of years (1977-1982) he was invited formally to assist the Nobel Committee in their nomination of candidates for the Nobel Prize in Physiology or Medicine and in 1997 he was elected as an honorary member (Excmo) of the Royal Academy of Medicine and Surgery in Murcia (60).

Notes

Publications 
 Smyth, D.G., Nagamatsu, A. and Fruton, J.S. (1960) Some reactions of N-ethyl maleimide. J. Am. Chem. Soc. 82, 4600–4604.
 Smyth, D.G. Battaglia., F.C. and Meschia, G. (1961) Studies on the Bohr effect of sheep haemoglobin. J. Gen. Physiol. 44, 889–898.
 Smyth, D.G. and Tuppy, H. (1968) Acylation reactions with cyclic imides. Biochim. Biophys. Acta, 168, 173–180.
 Smyth, D.G., Stein, W.H. and Moore, S. (1962) On the sequence of residues 11–18 in Bovine Pancreatic Ribonuclease. J. Biol. Chem., 237, 1845–1850.
 Smyth, D.G., Stein, W.H. and Moore, S. (1963) The Sequence of Amino Acid Residues in Bovine Pancreatic Ribonuclease: revisions and confirmations. J. Biol. Chem., 238, 227–234.
 Smyth, D.G. (1963) Proteins and Peptides. Annual Reports of the Chemical Society, 468–485.
 Smyth, D.G. and Elliott, D.F. (1964) Some analytical problems in determining the structure of proteins and peptides. J. Soc. Analyt. Chem., 89, 81–94.
 Smyth, D.G., (1967) Techniques in enzymic hydrolysis and sequence determination. In: Methods in Enzymology, C.H.W. Hirs (Ed) Academic Press, 11, 214–231.
 Smyth, D.G. (1967) Use of pepsin, papain and subtilisin in sequence determination. In: Methods in Enzymology, C.H.W. Hirs (Ed) Academic Press, 11, 421–426.
 Bisset, G.W., Poisner, A.M. and Smyth, D.G. (1963) Carbamylation of oxytocin and arginine vasopressin. Nature, 199, 69–70.
 Smyth, D.G. (1964) Reactions of cyanate with amino and hydroxyl groups: application to oxytocin. Hung. Chim. Acta, 44, 197–204.
 Smyth, D.G. (1967) Carbamylation of amino and tyrosine hydroxyl groups: preparation of an inhibitor of oxytocin with no intrinsic activity on the isolated uterus. J. Biol.Chem., 242, 1579–1591.
 Smyth, D.G. (1970) On the molecular mechanism of oxytocin action. Biochim. Biophys. Acta, 200, 395–403; Library of Congress Publication data, Current Research in oxytocin, 11–19.
 Smyth, D.G. (1964) Proteins and Peptides. Annual Reports of the Chemical Society, 507–525.
 Smyth, D.G. (1965) Proteins and Peptides. Annual Reports of the Chemical Society, 488–509.
 Smyth, D.G. (1967) Proteins and Peptides. Annual Reports of the Chemical Society, 249–261.
 Smyth, D.G. and Utsumi, S. (1967) Structure at the “hinge” region of rabbit immunoglobulin-G. Nature, 216, 232–235.
 Fanger, M.W. and Smyth, D.G. (1972) The oligosaccharide units of rabbit immunoglobulin-G: multiple carbohydrate attachment sites. Biochem. J., 127, 757-765.
 Fanger, M.W. and Smyth, D.G. (1972) The oligosaccharide units of rabbit immunoglobulin-G: asymmetric attachment of the C2 oligosaccharide. Biochem. J., 127, 767-774.
 Hinrichs, W.A. and Smyth, D.G. (1970) Studies on the asymmetrically attached oligosaccharide of rabbit immunoglobulin-G; on the biological function of the C2 oligosaccharide. Immunology, 18, 768–774.
 Hinrichs, W.A. and Smyth, D.G. (1970) Studies on the asymmetrically attached oligosaccharide of rabbit immunoglobulin-G; biosynthesis and stability of the C2 oligosaccharide. Immunology, 18, 759–770.
 Ko, A.S.C., Smyth, D.G., Markussen, J. and Sundby, F. (1971) The amino acid sequence of the C-peptide of Human Proinsulin. Eur.J. Biochem., 20, 190–199.
 Massey, D.E. and Smyth, D.G. (1975) Guinea Pig Proinsulin: primary structure of the C-peptide isolated from pancreas. J. Biol. Chem., 250, 6288–6290.
 Salokangas, A., Smyth, D.G., Markussen,J. and Sundby, F. (1971) Bovine Proinsulin: amino acid sequence of the C-peptide isolated from pancreas. Eur.J. Biochem., 20, 183–189.
 Snell, C.R. and Smyth, D.G. (1975) Proinsulin: a proposed three dimensional structure. J. Biol. Chem., 250, 6291–6295.
 Smyth, D.G. (1981) Chemistry of the opiate peptides: enkephalins and endorphins. In: Proceedings of the 6th European Peptide Symposium, K. Brunfeld (ed). Scriptor, Copenhagen, pp 56–69.
 Zakarian, S. and Smyth, D.G. (1981) Distribution of β-endorphin related peptides in rat pituitary and brain. Biochem. J., 202, 561–571; Proc. Natl. Acad. USA, (76) 5972–5976.
 Smyth, D.G., (1984) Chromatography of peptides related to β-endorphin. Analyt. Biochem., 136, 127–135.
 Smyth, D.G., Massey, D.E., Zakarian, S. and Finnie, M.D. (1979) Endorphins are stored in biologically active and inactive forms; isolation of alpha-N-acetyl peptides. Nature, 272, 252–254.
 Zakarian, S. and Smyth, D.G. (1982) β-endorphin is processed differently in specific regions of rat pituitary and brain. Nature, 296, 250–253.
 Smyth, D.G., Smith, C.C.F. and Zakarian, S. (1981) Isolation and identification of two new peptides related to β-endorphin. In: advances in endogenous and exogenous opioids. H. Takagi (Ed) Kodanski-Elsevier, Tokyo-Amsterdam., 145–148.
 Geisow, M.J., Dostrovsky, J.F.W. and Smyth, D.G. (1977) Analgesic activity of lipotropin C-Fragment depends on carboxyl terminal tetrapeptide. Nature, 269, 167–168.
 Parish, D.C. and Smyth D.G. (1982) Isolation of glycylglutamine, the C-terminal dipeptide of the β-endorphin corticotropin prohormone, Biochem Soc Trans. 10,221.
 Parish, D.C. and Smyth D.G., Normanton J.R. and Wolstencroft, J.H. (1983) Glycylglutamine, an inhibitory neuropeptide derived from β-endorphin. Nature (London), 306,267-270.
 Bradbury, A.F., Smyth, D.G. and Snell, C.R. (1975) Biosynthesis of β-MSH and ACTH. In: Peptides, Chemistry, Structure and Biology. R. Walters and J. Meienhofer (Eds). Ann Arbor Science Publishers Inc., Michigan, 609–615.
 Bradbury, A,F., Smyth, D.G. and Snell, C.R. (1976) Prohormones of β-melanotropin (β-melanocyte stimulating hormone, β-MSH) and corticotrophin (ACTH): structure and activation. In: Polypeptide Hormones, molecular and cellular aspects. R. Porter and D.W. FitzSimons (Eds) Elsevier/ Excerpta Medica, North Holland, 61–75.
 Smyth, D.G., Snell, C.R. and Massey, D.E. (1978) Isolation of the C-fragment and C’-fragment of lipotropin from pig pituitary and the C-fragment from brain. Biochem. J., 175, 261–270.
 Bradbury, A.F., Smyth, D.G., Snell, C.R. Birdsall, N.J.M. and Hulme, E.C. (1976) C-Fragment of lipotropin has a high affinity for brain opiate receptors. Nature, 260, 793–796.
 Feldberg, W.S. and Smyth, D.G. (1976) The C-Fragment of lipotropin, a potent analgesic. J. Physiol. (London), 260, 30P.
 Feldberg, W.S. and Smyth, D.G. (1977) C-Fragment of lipotropin, an endogenous potent analgesic peptide. Br. J. Pharmacol., 60, 445–454.
 Bradbury, A.F., Smyth, D.G., Snell, C.R., Deakin, J.F.W. and Wendlandt, S. (1977) Comparison of the analgesic properties of lipotropin C-Fragment and stabilised enkephalins in the rat. Biochem. Biophys. Res. Commun. 64, 748–753.
 Smyth, D.G. (1983) Opioid Peptides and Pain. In: Clinics in Anaesthesiology, 1, 201–217.
 Smyth, D.G. (1976) Searching for the endogenous analgesic. Lancet Editorial, 665–666.
 Gispen, W.H., de Wied, D., Bradbury, A.F., Hulme, E.C., Smyth, D.G. and Snell, C.R. (1976) Induction of excessive grooming in the rat by fragments of lipotropin. Nature, 264, 792–794.
 Van Ree, J.M., Smyth, D.G. and Colpaert, F.C. (1979) Dependence creating properties of lipotropin C-Fragment (β-endorphin): evidence for its internal control of behaviour. Life Sci., 24, 495–502.
 Bradbury, A. F., Finnie, M.D.F. and Smyth, D.G. (1982) Mechanism of C-terminal amide formation by pituitary enzymes. Nature, 298, 686–689.
 Bradbury, A.F. and Smyth, D.G. (1991) Peptide amidation. TIBS., 16, 112–115.
 Bradbury, A.F. and Smyth, D.G. (1987) Enzyme catalysed peptide amidation: isolation of a stable intermediate formed by reaction of the amidating enzyme with an imino acid. Eur. J. Biochem. 169, 579–584.
 Bradbury, A.F., Mistry, J., Roos, B.A. and Smyth, D.G. (1990) 4-Phenyl-3-butenoic acid, an in vivo inhibitor of peptidylglycine hydroxylase (peptide amidating enzyme). Eur.J.Biochem., 189, 363–368.
 Cockle, S,M., Aitken, A., Beg, F. and Smyth, D.G. (1989) A novel peptide, pyroglutamylglutamylproline amide, in the rabbit prostate complex, structurally related to thyrotropin releasing hormone. J. Biol. Chem., 264, 7788–7791.
 Khan, Z., Aitken,A., del Rio-Garcia, J. and Smyth, D.G. (1992) Isolation and identification of two neutral thyrotropin hormone-like peptides, pyroglutamylphenylalanine proline amide and pyroglutamylglutamine proline amide from human seminal fluid. J. Biol. Chem., 267, 7464–7469.
 Cockle, S.M., Aitken, A., Beg, F. and Smyth, D.G. (1989) The TRH-related peptide pyroglutamylglutamylproline amide is present in human seminal fluid. FEBS Letts., 252, 113–117.
 del Rio-Garcia, J. and Smyth, D.G. (1990) Distribution of pyroglutamylpeptide amides in the central nervous system and periphery of the rat. J. Endocrinol., 127, 445–450.
 Bilek, R., Gkonos, P.J., Tavianini, M., Smyth, D.G. and Roos, B.A. (1992) The thyrotropin releasing hormone (TRH)-like peptides in rat prostate are not formed by expression of the TRH gene but are suppressed by thyroid hormone. J. Endocrinol., 132, 177–184.
 Schally, A.V., Redding, T.W., Bowers, C.Y. and Barrett, J.F. (1969) "Isolation and properties of porcine thyrotropin-releasing hormone. J Biol Chem 44 (15) 4077- 4088.
 Linden, H., del Rio-Garcia, J., Huber, A., Kreil, G. and Smyth, D.G. (1996) The TRH-like peptides in rabbit testis are different from the TRH-like peptide in the prostate. FEBS Letts., 379, 11–14.
 Huber, A.E., Fraser, H., del Rio-Garcia, J., Kreil, G. and Smyth, D.G. (1998) Molecular cloning in the marmoset shows that the TRH-like peptide pGlu-Glu-Pro amide is not formed from semenogelin. Biochem. Biophys. Acta, 1387, 143–152.
 Rausell, V., Fraser, H.M., Tobaruela, M., del Rio-Garcia, J. and Smyth, D.G. (1998) Identification of the TRH-like peptides pGlu-Glu-Pro amide and pGlu-Phe-Pro amide in rat thyroid: regulation by thyroid status. Regulatory peptides, 31, 55–60.
 Ghilchik, M.W., Tobaruela, M., del Rio-Garcia,J. and Smyth, D.G. (2000) The TRH-like peptide pGlu-Phe-Pro amide is present in rat and human mammary gland and is secreted in the milk. Biochem. Biophys. Acta, 1475, 55–60.
 Smyth, D.G., del Rio-Garcia, J., Wallnofer, H., Gogl, H., Simma, W., Huber, A., Embacher, R., Fraser, H. and Kreil, G. (1999) Protirelin (thyrotropin-releasing hormone) in the thyroid gland: possible involvement in regulation of thyroid status. Acta Pharmacol. Sin., 20, 289–291.
 Smyth, D.G. (1997) Discovering biologically active peptides; from structure to function. Anales de la Real Academia de Medicina y Cirugia de Murcia, 49–70.
 Smyth, D.G. (2016) Lipotropin & beta-endorphin: a perspective. J. Mol Endocrinol.56, T13-25.

1927 births
Living people
People from Kingston upon Thames
British biochemists
National Institute for Medical Research faculty
Fellows of the Royal Society of Chemistry